Lefler is a surname. Notable people with the name include:

 Doug Lefler, American film director, screenwriter, film producer and storyboard artist
 Franz Lefler (1831–1898), Austrian painter
 Heinrich Lefler (1863–1919), Austrian painter, graphic artist and stage designer
 John Lefler (born 1975), American songwriter, singer, guitarist, and pianist
 Wade Lefler (1896–1981), Major League Baseball player